Epworth is a constituency of the National Assembly of the Parliament of Zimbabwe. It is currently represented by Zalerah Makari of ZANU–PF.

Members

References 

Harare Province
Parliamentary constituencies in Zimbabwe